Coronacomitas is a genus of sea snails, marine gastropod mollusks in the family Horaiclavidae.

This genus was originally proposed by T. Shuto in 1983 as a subgenus of Paradrillia for Paradrillia gemmata. It showed some resemblance to Pleurotoma multiseriata Smith, 1877, synonym of Epidirona multiseriata (E. A. Smith, 1877). It differs however by the position of the anal sinus which is situated on the shoulder slope and not on the shoulder itself.

References

 T. Shuto, 1983. New turrid taxa from the Australian waters. Mem. Fac. Sci. Kyushu Univ. [D]25 (1): 1-26, pis. 1–2.

External links
  Bouchet, P.; Kantor, Y. I.; Sysoev, A.; Puillandre, N. (2011). A new operational classification of the Conoidea. Journal of Molluscan Studies. 77, 273-308

 
Horaiclavidae
Gastropod genera